Miskito ( in the Miskito language) is a Misumalpan language spoken by the Miskito people in northeastern Nicaragua, especially in the North Caribbean Coast Autonomous Region, and in eastern Honduras.

With around 150,000 speakers, Miskito is the most widely spoken of a family of languages of Nicaragua and Honduras that has come to be known as Misumalpan. This name is formed from parts of the names of the family's subgroups: Miskito, Sumo, Matagalpan. The relationship of some aspects of the internal family tree to the family is uncertain. However, it is clear that: (1) Miskito is apart from Sumo and Matagalpan, which seem to share a common lower node, and (2) in the past Miskito was heavily influenced by other languages like English, German and Dutch. Sumo is thought to have been dominant in the area before the period of Miskito ascendancy. Today the relationship has been reversed: many former Sumo speakers have shifted to Miskito, which has in turn heavily influenced the Sumo dialects. Several of these (Tawahka, Panamahka and Tuahka) constitute the Mayangna sub-branch of Sumo, while the Ulwa language is in another sub-branch. The Matagalpan branch of Misumalpan contains two languages that are now extinct: Matagalpa and Cacaopera. The latter was formerly spoken in parts of eastern El Salvador.

In addition to many elements borrowed from other Misumalpan languages, Miskito has many loanwords from Germanic languages like English, German and Dutch. Even though Spanish is the official language of Nicaragua and Honduras, its influence on Miskito is much more recent and hence more superficial. Many other languages appear to have had influence on Miskito vocabulary and grammar, including various Sumi dialects, Arawak, Rama, Carib, and certain Western African languages.

Miskito Alphabet  
The alphabet for Miskito consists of 19 letters, and includes vowels and consonants.

A (a), B (be), D (de), G (ge), H (ha), I (i), J (je), K (ka), L (el), M (em), N (en), P (pe), Q (ku), R (ar), S (es), T (te), U (u), W (dubilu), Y (yei).

European countries in Miskito language  
Aislant (Iceland), Albania (Albania), Andorra (Andorra), Austerais (Austria), Azerbaiyang (Azerbaijan), Belgium (Belgium), Belarus (Belarus), Bosnia (Bosnia), Bulgari (Bulgaria), Denmark (Denmark), Dotslant o Jermani (Germany), Estonia (Estonia), Finlant (Finland), Frankrais (France), Georgia (Georgia), Grizlant (Greece), Hungari (Hungary), Inglant o Kingdom Asla (United Kingdom), Irlant (Ireland), Itali (Italy), Malta (Malta), Kroatia (Croatia), Lichtenstain (Liechtenstein), Lituain (Lithuania), Latvia (Latvia), Luksemburk (Luxembourg), Moldova (Moldova), Mazedon (Macedonia), Monaco (Monaco), Montenegro (Montenegro), Nederlants (Netherlands), Nurwei (Norway), Romania (Romania), Ruslant (Russia), Polant (Poland), Portugal (Portugal), Slovakia (Slovakia), Sloven (Slovenia), Serbia (Serbia), Espania (Spain), San Marino (San Marino), Estonia (San Marino), Suiden (Sweden), Suitzerlant (Switzerland), Turki (Turkey), Ukrain (Ukraine), Vatikan (Vatican), Zets Republik (Czech Republic).

Latin American and Caribbean countries in Miskito language 
Mexiko (Mexico), Guatemala (Guatemala), Beliz (Belize), Kuba (Cuba), Honduras (Honduras), El Salvador (El Salvador), Jamaika (Jamaica), Haiti (Haiti), Dominikan Republik (Dominican Republic), Port Rico (Puerto Rico), Kaimang Ailantnan (Caiman Islands), Nikaragua (Nicaragua), Costa Rica (Costa Rica), Panama (Panama), Kolombia (Colombia), Venezuela (Venezuela), Guyana (Guyana), Ekuador (Ecuador), Bolivia (Bolivia), Peru (Peru), Brazil (Brazil), Paraguai (Paraguay), Chile (Chile), Argentina (Argentina), Uruguai (Uruguay).

History  
Many of the Miskitos are native American and also mixed with British, Chinese, Dutch, German, North American, Latinos and African. The Miskito people had a strong relationship with the British and they signed the Treaty of Friendship and Alliance. Eventually, the British began to lose interest in the region, and Britain allowed Nicaragua to have uncontested claim over the Mosquito Coast. A treaty was signed in which a Miskito reserve, a self-governing entity that enjoyed semi-sovereign rights, was given to the Miskito people, but Honduras eventually took over the area.

In the 20th century the Miskito language started to dwindle. Honduras, being a former Spanish colony, officially used the Spanish language, and this stifled the proliferation of the Miskito language in the 20th century. In schools, children were forbidden from speaking Miskito for most of the 20th century and could only speak Spanish; young generations had less of an opportunity to practice the language.

In the 1990s, many groups lobbied against the rule and promoted bilingual schools to preserve the Miskito language. Twenty such bilingual schools exist.

Orthography and phonology 

G. R. Heath wrote on Miskito grammar in American Anthropologist in 1913 and describes its orthography and phonology as follows:

There is still much controversy about Miskito orthography and it cannot be considered settled, even with printed Miskito grammars, Bible translations, and other texts.

Basic words

Old Miskito numbers

Modern Miskito numbers 

By Felix Ramsin.

Months of the year

Days of the week 

By Felix Ramsin.

See also

Miskito language (typological overview)
Miskito grammar
Miskito Coast Creole

References

Further reading
  (Reprinted 1964, Nendeln/ Liechtenstein: Kraus).

External links

 Miskitu Language Collection of Natalia Bermúdez and Wanda Luz Waldan Peter – archive of audio and video recordings and text transcriptions of historical narratives from native speakers from AILLA.
 Recording of a song in Miskito with an interview in English – from the Collection of Miskito, Quechua and Tseltal of June Nash at AILLA.
 Miskito – English – Spanish Dictionary
 Notes in Miskito Grammar
 Miskito-Spanish Dictionary

Language
Misumalpan languages
Indigenous languages of Central America
Languages of Nicaragua
North Caribbean Coast Autonomous Region
Languages of Honduras